Haplochromis velifer is a species of cichlid endemic to Lake Nabugabo, Uganda.  This species reaches a length of  SL.

References

velifer
Endemic freshwater fish of Uganda
Cichlid fish of Africa
Lake fish of Africa
Fish described in 1933
Taxonomy articles created by Polbot